{{DISPLAYTITLE:C29H35NO2}}
The molecular formula C29H35NO2 may refer to:

 Mifepristone, a medication typically used in combination to bring about an abortion during pregnancy
 Miproxifene, a nonsteroidal selective estrogen receptor modulator